Peter Edmund Fernbank is a philatelist who, in 1998, was awarded the Crawford Medal by the Royal Philatelic Society London for his King George V Key Plates of the Imperium Postage and Revenue Design.

Selected publications
King George V Key Plates of the Imperium Postage and Revenue Design. Banbury: West Africa Study Circle, 1997.

References

Year of birth missing (living people)
Fellows of the Royal Philatelic Society London
Living people
British philatelists